Jeff Ford may refer to:
Jeff Ford (kickboxer), see AXS TV Fights
Jeffrey Ford (born 1955), American writer
Jeffrey Ford (film editor), American film editor